Classy is a software company and online fundraising platform designed for nonprofit organizations. Headquartered in San Diego, California, Classy was founded by CEO Scot Chisholm, Pat Walsh, and Marshall Peden in 2006, originally to host fundraising events that benefit charities. The firm transitioned to a software and services company in 2010. Its software as a service products launched in 2011 and focus on peer-to-peer fundraising, crowdfunding, events, supporter management and marketing automation. In September 2016, Classy closed $30 million in Series C funding from JMI Equity, Peter Thiel's Mithril Capital, Salesforce Ventures, and Bullpen Capital. In April 2021, it raised $118 million in series D funding, making Classy a Public Benefit Corporation.

History
Founder Scot Chisholm graduated from college with a degree in mechanical and industrial engineering and moved to San Diego the next day, eventually going to work for Booz Allen Hamilton. Because his mother had had cancer when he was a child, and a number of his friends had similar family experiences, they organized a charity pub crawl to raise money for the American Cancer Society. The event raised $1,000.

At one of the planning sessions for the pub crawl, the movie Anchorman was on in the background. The sign-off of Will Ferrell's character, Ron Burgundy, "You stay classy, San Diego", inspired the name for pub crawl and continued as the company name.

Chisholm continued organizing events for a variety of organizations. He became frustrated with offline methods so in 2006 he cobbled together a system that was "a combination of Evite, PayPal, and Myspace." This system could not meet performance requirements as the pace and size of events grew to include a 5,000 attendee music festival. Eventually Chisholm hired a local software developer through a Craigslist advertisement to build a customized application. In 2011 Chisholm relaunched Classy as a technology company, with original co-founders Pat Walsh and Marshall Peden, and newly added software developer Peter Nystrom and designer Joe Callahan.

To continue its development, Classy worked with CONNECT incubator. In June 2015 Classy secured its Series B round of venture capital funding from Mithril Capital Management and Salesforce Ventures. At that time the company had 80 employees. The main purpose for the funding was to triple the size of its 15-person engineering team and expand its international functionality.

In September 2016, Classy closed $30 million in Series C funding from JMI Equity, Mithril Capital, Salesforce Ventures, and Bullpen Capital.

Classy has over 2,500 clients, including Shriners Hospitals for Children, City of Hope National Medical Center, Malala Fund, the Leukemia & Lymphoma Society, Teach for America, Girls Who Code, Ushahidi, Oxfam, World Food Programme and National Geographic. The company expects to break $1 billion in donations processed through its service in 2018.

In 2010, the company established the Classy Awards to recognize innovative nonprofits addressing significant challenges. It will hold its eighth annual Classy Awards in June 2018.

References

Bibliography

External links
 

Crowdfunding platforms of the United States
American fundraising websites
Social finance
Companies based in San Diego
Financial services companies established in 2006
Internet properties established in 2006
2006 establishments in California